Coleophora albostraminata is a moth of the family Coleophoridae. It is found in Spain.

References

albostraminata
Moths described in 1960
Moths of Europe